Christ Church is in Victoria Road, Fulwood, Preston, Lancashire, England.  It is an active Anglican parish church in the deanery of Preston, the archdeaconry of Lancaster, and the diocese of Blackburn. The church was built in 1854–55 and designed by Myres and Veevers.  It is constructed in stone with some polychromy in the dressings.  The north steeple has a square porch at the base, and becomes octagonal as it rises.  There are no aisles, and inside the church is a hammerbeam roof.  In 1937 the Lancaster practice of Austin and Paley added a Chapel of Remembrance.

See also

List of ecclesiastical works by Austin and Paley (1916–44)

References

Church of England church buildings in Lancashire
Diocese of Blackburn
Austin and Paley buildings
Gothic Revival church buildings in England
Gothic Revival architecture in Lancashire
19th-century Church of England church buildings
Churches in Preston